The 2004 South American Rugby Championship "B" was the fifth edition of the competition of the second level national Rugby Union teams in South America.

The tournament was played in São Paulo, with four team participating.

Paraguay won for the first time the tournament.

Standings 
 Three point for victory, two for draw, and one for lost 
{| class="wikitable"
|-
!width=165|Team
!width=40|Played
!width=40|Won
!width=40|Drawn
!width=40|Lost
!width=40|For
!width=40|Against
!width=40|Difference
!width=40|Pts
|- bgcolor=#ccffcc align=center
|align=left| 
|3||3||0||0||175||24||+ 151||9
|- align=center
|align=left| 
|3||2||0||1||164||25||+ 139||7
|- align=center
|align=left| 
|3||1||0||2||18||157||- 139||5
|- align=center
|align=left| 
|3||0||0||3||17||168||- 151||3
|}

Results  
 First Round

Second Round

Third Round

References

2004
2004 rugby union tournaments for national teams
B
rugby union
rugby union
rugby union
rugby union
International rugby union competitions hosted by Brazil